KB Life Insurance Co, Ltd. (hangul:KB생명, 케이비생명) is a life insurance company, headquartered in Seoul, South Korea. As of  20 June 2013 fully owned by KB Group, KB Life originally was a joint venture between KB Group (51%) and ING Group (49%). KB Life was established in 2004 originally with a bancassurance only distribution model, but today has developed into a multichannel insurer, offering savings, annuities and protection products for Korean individuals and families.

See also
Economy of South Korea
KB Group
KB Life homepange

References

Homepage
KB Life Homepage

Companies based in Seoul
Insurance companies of South Korea
KB Financial Group Inc
Financial services companies established in 2004
South Korean companies established in 2004
Life insurance companies